Muisky Gigant is a mountain in the Southern Muya Range, Stanovoy Highlands, Russia. Administratively it is located in Buryatia, Russian Federation.

Following four failed attempts to climb the peak, the first ascent of Muysky Gigant, took place on 8 July 1993, by a group of students of the Novosibirsk Institute of Railway Engineers led by alpinist  and tour organizer Alexander Kuzminykh.

Geography

At  this mountain is the highest peak of the Southern Muya Range. Muisky Gigant rises from a massif that constitutes a short spur of the main axis of the range. The Bambukoy River, a left tributary of the Bambuyka of the Vitim river basin, has its sources in the southeastern slopes of the mountain.

See also
List of mountains and hills of Russia
List of ultras of Northeast Asia
Mount Shaman, the highest peak of the range on the Transbaikalia side

References

External links
Гигантомания (in Russian)

Stanovoy Highlands
Mountains of Buryatia